The High Commission of Sri Lanka in Islamabad is the diplomatic mission of Sri Lanka to Pakistan. The high commission is also accredited to Kyrgyzstan and Tajikistan. The current high commissioner is H.E. Noordeen Mohamed Shaheid.

High Commissioners

References

External links
 

Sri Lanka
Islamabad
Pakistan–Sri Lanka relations